The Power Station of Art is a contemporary art museum in Shanghai.  Housed in a former power station, it is China's first state-run contemporary art museum.  Converting the building cost $64 million which was paid for by the Shanghai government.

The museum is on the site of the Expo 2010 and on the left bank of the Huangpu River. It opened in 2012 with an exhibition of contemporary art from Centre Pompidou, Paris's best-known contemporary art museum, entitled Electric Fields, Surrealism and Beyond.

The director is Li Xu. The deputy director is Gong Yan, who was formerly the editor in chief of the Chinese-language magazine Art World.

See also
 50 Moganshan Road
 West Bund Art & Design
 Long Museum
 China Art Museum
 Museum of Contemporary Art Shanghai
 Shanghai Museum
 Tianzifang
 Xintiandi
 798 Art Zone

References

 NRC, Oscar Garschagen on Chinese museums and collectors.  Page C4. 10 July 2014

Art museums established in 2012
Museums in Shanghai
2012 establishments in China
Contemporary art galleries in China